Dendrobium affine, commonly known as the white butterfly orchid, malakmalak or matngala in Australian Aboriginal languages is an epiphytic orchid in the family Orchidaceae. It has cylindrical pseudobulbs, each with up to ten leaves and flowering stems with up to twenty white flowers with yellow or purple markings on the labellum. It occurs in northern Australia, New Guinea and Timor, where it grows on the bark of trees.

Description
The petals are about the same length as the sepals but broader. The side lobes are upright and the middle lobe often curves downwards and has five ridges along its midline. Flowering occurs from March to August.

Taxonomy and naming
The white tea tree orchid was first formally described in 1834 by Joseph Decaisne who gave it the name Onychium affine and published the description in Nouvelles annales du Muséum d'histoire naturelle. In 1840 Ernst Gottlieb von Steudel changed the name to Dendrobium affine in his book Nomenclator Botanicus. The specific epithet (affine) is a Latin word meaning "related to" or "neighboring".

Distribution and habitat
Dendrobium affine is a bark epiphyte and grows on trees in moist places such as rainforest, on stream banks and in paperbark swamps. It is found in northern parts of the Northern Territory including Melville Island, the Kimberley region of Western Australia and the Moluccas. It occurred on Timor in the past but may now be extinct there.

References

affine
Orchids of the Northern Territory
Orchids of New Guinea
Orchids of Western Australia
Plants described in 1834
Taxa named by Joseph Decaisne